Maraya is a well known satiric multi-season Syrian television series, created by the comedian Yasser al-Azmeh, starting from 1982 to 2013.

See also
 List of Syrian television series

External links
Alreef Production

Syrian television series
1982 Syrian television series debuts
1980s Syrian television series
1990s Syrian television series
2000s Syrian television series
2010s Syrian television series

References